Taymyr Island is a large island in the coast of the Kara Sea. This island is located west of the Taymyr Gulf in an area of skerries right off the western coast of the Taymyr Peninsula.

Geography
Taymyr Island is one of the islands of the coastal area of the Nordenskiöld Archipelago. 
The shores of Taymyr Island and some of its larger neighboring islands, such as Nansena, Bonevi and Pilota Makhotkina, are deeply indented, with many crooked inlets. The sounds between this island and neighboring islands are also somewhat labyrinthic. Geologically all these coastal islands are a continuation of the Nordenskiöld Archipelago which lies further north.

The sea surrounding Taymyr Island is covered with pack ice with some polynias during the long and bitter winters and there are many ice floes even in the Arctic summer.

Taymyr Island belongs to the Krasnoyarsk Krai administrative division of Russia and is part of the Great Arctic State Nature Reserve – the largest nature reserve of Russia and one of the biggest in the world.

History
In October 1900, during Baron Eduard von Toll’s fateful last expedition, winter quarters for ship Zarya were set at Nablyudeniy Island and a scientific station was built there. This is a small granite island southwest of Taymyr Island, located in a bay that Baron Toll named Bukhta Kolin Archera (Colin Archer Bay), after the shipyard where Zarya had been built.

In some maps Taymyr Island is named simply as Taymyra.

See also
 Kara Sea
 List of islands of Russia
 Taymyr Strait

References

External links 
 Nansen's explorations

Islands of the Nordenskiöld Archipelago
Islands of Krasnoyarsk Krai